Allin is both a surname and a given name. Notable people with the name include:

Surname:
Buddy Allin (1944–2007), American golfer
GG Allin (1956–1993), punk rock singer-songwriter and musician
Merle Allin (born 1953), American bassist
Norman Allin (1884–1973), British bass singer
Roger Allin (1848–1936), American politician
Rosena Allin-Khan, British politician
Sir Thomas Allin, 1st Baronet (17th century), English naval officer

Given name:
Allin Braund (1915–2004), British artist
Eric Allin Cornell (born 1961), American physicist
Allin Kempthorne (born 1973), British actor and magician

See also
Alan (disambiguation)
Alen (given name)
Allan (disambiguation)
Alleine
Allen (disambiguation)
Allín
Allin baronets
Allin Township